The 1987–88 Norwegian 1. Divisjon season was the 49th season of ice hockey in Norway. Ten teams participated in the league, and Valerenga Ishockey won the championship.

Regular season

Playoffs

External links 
 Norwegian Ice Hockey Federation

Nor
1987-88
1987 in Norwegian sport
1988 in Norwegian sport